A pubilla (plural pubilles) in ancestral Catalan tradition was the female that would inherit the whole rural estate in the absence of a brother.

Tradition
She was the female version of the hereu or male heir of the whole property of the family. Traditionally, when a couple had no son, the eldest girl of the family would inherit the home and the estate in ancient Catalonia. The purpose was not to divide estates that were already too small to exploit in a profitable manner.

From mid 20th century onwards the image of the pubilla underwent a change; in present times the pubilla has a role similar to a local beauty queen in local popular celebrations.
Sometimes the female gegants are dressed as a pubilla, like in Manresa. Often the naming of a pubilla is a good occasion for a Catalan girl to dress in the traditional costume.

See also
Traditions of Catalonia
Symbols of Catalonia
Ciutat Pubilla de la Sardana

References

Literature
Kathryn A. Woolard, Double talk: bilingualism and the politics of ethnicity in Catalonia, Stanford University Press (1989),

External links

L'hereu i la pubilla de la Garrotxa: una qüestió de devoció, no de vocació
Elecció de l'hereu i pubilla de la catalunya central 2010

Catalan culture
Inheritance law by country